Clown Prince of the Menthol Trailer is a 1994 EP by Guided by Voices.

The song Matter Eater Lad is based on the superhero within the DC Universe of the same name.

Track listing
All songs written by Robert Pollard unless otherwise noted.

Side A
 "Matter Eater Lad" – 1:12
 "Broadcaster House" (Jim Pollard, R. Pollard, Tobin Sprout) – 1:08
 "Hunter Complex" (Jim Pollard, R. Pollard) – 1:41
 "Pink Gun" – 0:36
 "Scalping the Guru" – 1:01

Side B
 "Grandfather Westinghouse" – 2:24
 "Johnny Appleseed" (Jim Pollard, R. Pollard, Tobin Sprout) – 2:21

References

1994 EPs
Guided by Voices EPs